Kolleru Bird Sanctuary is a sanctuary in Andhra Pradesh, India. It covers 673 square kilometers. It was established in November 1999, under the Wildlife Protection Act of 1972. The sanctuary protects part of the Kolleru Lake wetland, which gained Ramsar Convention for International importance in 2002.

Geography 

Kolleru Bird Sanctuary is located in the Eluru district of Andhra Pradesh between the River Krishna and River Godavari deltas spread over 10 to 25 km from Eluru City.

Flora 
The main flora of the sanctuary is Phragmites karka, a weed that grows up to 10 feet in height and that offers shelter for some species of birds. The aquatic vegetation includes species such as Nymphaeae nouchali, Nyphoides indicum, Ottelia alismoides, Nechamandra alternifolia, Limnophila indica, Vallisneria spiralis, Blyxa octandra, Ipomoea aquatica, Scirpus articulatus, Paspalidium germinatum, Typha angustata, and Phragmites karka.

Contour dispute 
Contours are lines drawn on a map, joining points of equal height above the sea level (mean sea level). In the past, the water level in the lake was between contour 7 and 10 during the monsoon, and it fell to contour 3 during the dry season. The area in contour 3 is 135 square kilometres and the area in contour 10 is 901 square kilometres.

These conditions do not prevail any more with fish tanks and roads occupying most of the lake. The local fishing community known as Suryavansha Vaddis say that from the times of 13th century during Eastern Ganga Dynasty rule they have had descendant rights on Kolleru Lake; they have appealed to the government to decrease from +5 contour (308 km2) to +3 contour (135 km2), asserting that they were protectors of birds from Langula Gajapathi Raju period.

See also 
Bird sanctuaries of India

References

External links 

Kolleru Water Lake Tourism Site
Committee makes secret visit to Kolleru
Ap seeks changes in contours of kolleru wild life sanctuary

Bird sanctuaries of Andhra Pradesh
Protected areas established in 1999
1999 establishments in Andhra Pradesh